Lawrence Township is a township in Cumberland County, in the U.S. state of New Jersey. It is part of the Vineland-Bridgeton metropolitan statistical area for statistical purposes. As of the 2020 United States census, the township's population was 3,087, a decrease of 203 (−6.2%) from the 2010 census count of 3,290, which in turn reflected an increase of 569 (+20.9%) from the 2,721 counted in the 2000 census.

Lawrence Township was incorporated as a township by an act of the New Jersey Legislature on February 17, 1885, from portions of Fairfield Township. The township was named in honor of Captain James Lawrence—commander of the frigate  and one of the naval heroes of the War of 1812—best known for his dying command of "Don't Give up the Ship".

Lawrence Township is a dry township, where alcohol cannot be sold.

Geography
According to the United States Census Bureau, the township had a total area of 38.39 square miles (99.43 km2), including 36.92 square miles (95.63 km2) of land and 1.47 square miles (3.80 km2) of water (3.82%).

Cedarville (2010 population of 776) and Centre Grove are unincorporated communities and census-designated places (CDP) located Lawrence Township.

Other unincorporated communities, localities and place names located partially or completely within the township include Jones Island, Lummis Mill, Lummistown and Sayres Neck.

The township borders the Cumberland County municipalities of Downe Township, Fairfield Township, Millville, and the Delaware Bay.

Demographics

2010 census

The Census Bureau's 2006–2010 American Community Survey showed that (in 2010 inflation-adjusted dollars) median household income was $70,948 (with a margin of error of +/− $4,480) and the median family income was $72,014 (+/− $2,843). Males had a median income of $55,208 (+/− $6,323) versus $30,382 (+/− $5,144) for females. The per capita income for the borough was $27,934 (+/− $3,545). About 5.2% of families and 6.1% of the population were below the poverty line, including 7.1% of those under age 18 and 8.6% of those age 65 or over.

2000 census
As of the 2000 United States census there were 2,721 people, 920 households, and 712 families residing in the township. The racial makeup of the township was 81.88% White, 10.40% African American, 1.07% Native American, 0.26% Asian, 0.18% Pacific Islander, 3.42% from other races, and 2.79% from two or more races. Hispanic or Latino of any race were 7.02% of the population.

There were 920 households, out of which 38.4% had children under the age of 18 living with them, 60.8% were married couples living together, 11.6% had a female householder with no husband present, and 22.6% were non-families. 17.8% of all households were made up of individuals, and 8.4% had someone living alone who was 65 years of age or older.  The average household size was 2.90 and the average family size was 3.27.

In the township the population was spread out, with 28.5% under the age of 18, 6.7% from 18 to 24, 30.9% from 25 to 44, 23.3% from 45 to 64, and 10.5% who were 65 years of age or older.  The median age was 36 years. For every 100 females, there were 99.3 males.  For every 100 females age 18 and over, there were 98.2 males.

The median income for a household in the township was $46,083, and the median income for a family was $48,456. Males had a median income of $36,891 versus $22,188 for females. The per capita income for the township was $17,654.  About 6.2% of families and 8.9% of the population were below the poverty line, including 6.3% of those under age 18 and 7.3% of those age 65 or over.

Government

Local government
Lawrence Township is governed under the Township form of New Jersey municipal government, one of 141 municipalities (of the 564) statewide that use this form, the second-most commonly used form of government in the state. The governing body is comprised of a three-member Township Committee, whose members are elected directly by the voters at-large in partisan elections to serve three-year terms of office on a staggered basis, with one seat coming up for election each year as part of the November general election in a three-year cycle. At an annual reorganization meeting, the Township Committee selects one of its members to serve as Mayor and another as Deputy Mayor.

, members of the Lawrence Township Council are Mayor Joseph A. Miletta Jr. (D, term on committee ends December 31, 2024; term as mayor ends 2022), Deputy Mayor Elmer "Skip" Bowman (R, term on committee ends 2023; term as deputy mayor ends 2022) and G. Erwin Sheppard (R, 2022).

The New Jersey State Police provides police protection in Lawrence Township from the Troop A barracks located in Port Norris.

Federal, state and county representation 
Lawrence Township is located in the 2nd Congressional District and is part of New Jersey's 1st state legislative district. Prior to the 2011 reapportionment following the 2010 Census, Lawrence Township had been in the 3rd state legislative district.

Politics
As of March 2011, there were a total of 1,917 registered voters in Lawrence Township, of which 584 (30.5%) were registered as Democrats, 364 (19.0%) were registered as Republicans and 969 (50.5%) were registered as Unaffiliated. There were no voters registered to other parties.

In the 2012 presidential election, Republican Mitt Romney received 52.6% of the vote (618 cast), ahead of Democrat Barack Obama with 45.9% (539 votes), and other candidates with 1.4% (17 votes), among the 1,187 ballots cast by the township's 1,972 registered voters (13 ballots were spoiled), for a turnout of 60.2%. In the 2008 presidential election, Republican John McCain received 48.8% of the vote (613 cast), ahead of Democrat Barack Obama, who received 48.3% (607 votes), with 1,256 ballots cast among the township's 1,894 registered voters, for a turnout of 66.3%. In the 2004 presidential election, Republican George W. Bush received 51.8% of the vote (586 ballots cast), outpolling Democrat John Kerry, who received 45.7% (517 votes), with 1,131 ballots cast among the township's 1,683 registered voters, for a turnout percentage of 67.2.

In the 2013 gubernatorial election, Republican Chris Christie received 68.7% of the vote (450 cast), ahead of Democrat Barbara Buono with 30.1% (197 votes), and other candidates with 1.2% (8 votes), among the 663 ballots cast by the township's 1,902 registered voters (8 ballots were spoiled), for a turnout of 34.9%. In the 2009 gubernatorial election, Republican Chris Christie received 46.9% of the vote (353 ballots cast), ahead of both Democrat Jon Corzine with 40.7% (306 votes) and Independent Chris Daggett with 7.3% (55 votes), with 752 ballots cast among the township's 1,865 registered voters, yielding a 40.3% turnout.

Education 
The Lawrence Township School District serves public school students in pre-kindergarten through eighth grade at Myron L. Powell School. As of the 2018–19 school year, the district, comprised of one school, had an enrollment of 507 students and 42.4 classroom teachers (on an FTE basis), for a student–teacher ratio of 12.0:1.

For ninth through twelfth grades, public school students in Lawrence Township are assigned to one of two school districts based on the location of their residence. Students attend high school either in Bridgeton or Millville, based on sending/receiving relationships with the respective school districts, the Bridgeton Public Schools and the Millville Public Schools. Students sent to Bridgeton attend Bridgeton High School. Students sent to Millville join students from Commercial Township, Maurice River Township and Woodbine and attend Memorial High School for ninth grade and half of the tenth grade and Millville Senior High School for half of the tenth grade through the twelfth grade.

Students are also eligible to attend Cumberland County Technology Education Center in Vineland, serving students from the entire county in its full-time technical training programs, which are offered without charge to students who are county residents.

Transportation

County Route 553 is the most significant roadway serving Lawrence Township.

Notable people

People who were born in, residents of, or otherwise closely associated with Lawrence Township include:

 Ephraim Bateman (1780–1829), represented New Jersey in the United States Senate from 1826 to 1829 and in the United States House of Representatives from 1815 to 1823
 John Davis (died 1863), United States Navy sailor in the American Civil War who received the Medal of Honor for his action aboard the 
 Ebenezer Elmer (1752–1843), physician and politician who represented New Jersey in the House of Representatives from 1801 to 1807
 Jonathan Elmer (1745–1817), politician who represented New Jersey in the United States Senate from 1789 to 1791
 Benjamin Franklin Howell (1844–1933), represented New Jersey's 3rd congressional district  from 1895 to 1911
 Samuel Alexander Kinnier Wilson (1878–1937), neurologist who described hepatolenticular degeneration, a copper metabolism disorder affecting the liver and central nervous system, that would later be called Wilson's disease

References

External links

Cumberland County webpage for Lawrence Township

 
1885 establishments in New Jersey
Populated places established in 1885
Township form of New Jersey government
Townships in Cumberland County, New Jersey